Casaleggio Boiro is a comune (municipality) in the Province of Alessandria in the Italian region Piedmont, located about  southeast of Turin and about  south of Alessandria.

Casaleggio Boiro borders the following municipalities: Bosio, Lerma, Montaldeo, Mornese, and Tagliolo Monferrato.

Demographic evolution

See also 
 Parco naturale delle Capanne di Marcarolo

References

Cities and towns in Piedmont